Gabrielle Daye (2 October 1911 – 5 January 2005) was an English stage, film and television actress, notable for her TV role as Mrs. Pring on Bless Me, Father. Other television appearances include Coronation Street (as Beattie Pearson, 1961, 1969, 1971, 1975, 1981, 1983–84), The War of Darkie Pilbeam (1968), Persuasion (1971), Survivors (Long Live The King, 1977), Dear Enemy (1981), Juliet Bravo (John the Lad, 1983), Ever Decreasing Circles (The Tea Party and The New Neighbour, 1984), Bleak House (1985) and A Very British Coup (1988). She also appeared in the feature films 10 Rillington Place (1971), Sunday Bloody Sunday (1971), Don't Just Lie There, Say Something! (1974), Cry Wolf (1980) and No Surrender (1985).

On stage, she was in the original Royal Court production of David Storey's In Celebration in 1969 for director Lindsay Anderson; and she reprised her role in his film version in 1975. She worked again for Anderson in the long running Ben Travers farce The Bed Before Yesterday at London's Lyric Theatre in 1975.

Filmography

References

External links 

1911 births
2005 deaths
English stage actresses
English film actresses
English soap opera actresses
English television actresses
Actresses from Manchester